Shooting was contested at the 2006 Asian Games in Doha, Qatar from December 2 to December 8, 2006.  Men's and women's competitions were held in pistol, rifle, running target, and shotgun. All competition took place at the Lusail Shooting Range.

Schedule

Medalists

Men

Women

Medal table

Participating nations
A total of 510 athletes from 35 nations competed in shooting at the 2006 Asian Games:

References

 ISSF Results Overview

External links
Official website

 
2006 Asian Games events
2006
Asian Games
Shooting competitions in Qatar